Vincent Matthews (15 January 1896 – 15 November 1950) was an English international footballer. He played for Oxford City, Boscombe, Bolton Wanderers, Tranmere Rovers, Sheffield United, Shamrock Rovers, Oswestry Town, Shrewsbury Town, and Morris Motors (Cowley).

Career
Born in Oxford, Matthews joined Tranmere Rovers from Bolton Wanderers in 1925, and did not miss a match until he was transferred to Sheffield United for £1,000 in 1927. Whilst with United, he earned two caps for England against France and Belgium at the end of the 1927–28 season. Matthews has been described as a "cultured attacking centre half ... well ahead of his time."

Matthews enjoyed considerable success later in his career after he joined Shamrock Rovers during the 1931-32 League of Ireland season where he captained the side to the league title. Matthews also scored during a comeback in the 1932-33 FAI Cup final helping to bring the game to a replay which Shamrock Rovers eventually won.

Honours 

Shamrock Rovers

League of Ireland
Winners (1) 1931–32 
FAI Cup
Winners (2) 1932, 1933

References

1896 births
1950 deaths
English footballers
England international footballers
Oxford City F.C. players
AFC Bournemouth players
Bolton Wanderers F.C. players
Tranmere Rovers F.C. players
Sheffield United F.C. players
Shamrock Rovers F.C. players
Oswestry Town F.C. players
Shrewsbury Town F.C. players
English Football League players
Footballers from Oxford
Association football central defenders